Jahangir Khan (born 3 October 2000) is a professional footballer who currently plays for Hong Kong Premier League club Southern. Born in Pakistan, he plays for the Hong Kong national team.

Early life
Born in Pakistan, Khan moved to Hong Kong at the age of 10.

Club career

Happy Valley
In August 2019, Khan was signed professionally by Happy Valley and was registered as a foreign player to play in the HKPL.

On 8 September 2020, Khan received his HKSAR passport, making him eligible to be registered as a local player in Hong Kong.

Southern
On 3 July 2021, Khan joined Southern.
He played 4 games as substitutes for the club in HKPL and featured 9 times in Sapling Cup with 2 goals in his first season in Southern.

International career
On 1 June 2022, Khan made his international debut for Hong Kong in the friendly match against Malaysia which makes him the first South Asian born player to represent Hong Kong.

Career statistics

Club

Notes

International

References

External links
 

Living people
2000 births
Sportspeople from Attock
Hong Kong footballers
Hong Kong international footballers
Pakistani footballers
Naturalized footballers of Hong Kong
Hong Kong people of Pakistani descent
Pakistani emigrants to Hong Kong
Pakistani expatriate footballers
Association football midfielders
Hong Kong First Division League players
Hong Kong Premier League players
Happy Valley AA players
Southern District FC players
Expatriate footballers in Hong Kong